SNDT Pune campus is a constituent campus of the Shreemati Nathibai Damodar Thackersey Women's University (SNDT) located in Pune, India. The university was founded in 1916 in the Karve Kutir (erstwhile residence of Maharshi Karve).

References

Universities and colleges in Pune
Educational institutions established in 1896
Women's universities and colleges in Maharashtra
University and college campuses in India
SNDT Women's University
1896 establishments in India